Rizwan Hussain ( Rezwan Husein; born 7 December 1973) is a Bangladeshi-born British television presenter, barrister and an international humanitarian worker. He is also a former Hindi music singer and producer and is best known for presenting Islamic programs and charity events on Islam Channel and Channel S. Hussain was CEO of the east London-based Global Aid Trust (GAT) education charity, until his resignation in response to the broadcast of Exposure: Charities Behaving Badly, an episode investigating charities allegedly promoting extremist views.

Background
Hussain was born in Bangladesh, and moved to the United Kingdom at a young age with his parents. His parents settled in Loughborough, Charnwood, Leicestershire. His late father was a retired soldier of the British Army.

Education
Hussain studied at the University of Derby where he studied Law and then at the City University London where he studied to become a barrister and was called to the Bar at Lincoln's Inn in 2006. Subsequently, he went on to qualify as a lecturer at the Nottingham Trent University by completing a PGCE in Further Education. He is currently undertaking a research LLM (Masters) on the subject of Anti-Terrorism legislation in the UK at the University of Huddersfield.

Career
Hussain is a lecturer of law who has worked as a human rights lawyer. He has also been a police officer, journalist, actor and singer. He is a television presenter on Islam Channel and Channel S, and is known for presenting Islamic and charity shows.

In the late 1990s, Hussain  became interested in music,  began performing under the band name Sargam, and eventually became known as a songwriter of popular albums, including B-Boy, featuring songs such as "Harr Pal Mujko" and "Jaan". He has appeared on the top Asian music shows on Vectone TV and ATN Global. During his music career, he had a hit single in the UK's Asian charts, which he was performing at various notable stadiums such as Wembley Arena in London, White Pearl in Birmingham and also in Scotland at the Central Park Glasgow.

Media and charity work
In 2005, after performing the Hajj, Hussain left his music career and decided to work with Islamic-oriented channels and charity organisations, such as Muslim Aid, Muslim Charity and Islamic Relief, on presenting many charity events on Islam Channel and Channel S. On Islam Channel, he is a presenter, producer and documentary director, and currently presents a children's program called National Qir’at Competition. On Channel S, he has presented Islam Essentials, which gives answers to people's questions about Islam in English and Bengali, as well as flagship contemporary youth discussion show Thinking Allowed.

Hussain travelled to Bangladesh during the aftermath of Cyclone Sidr in 2008 which left millions homeless. He went with Muslim Aid to assist in delivering water, food and clothing goods to the affected communities, alongside  Abdul Jolil Miah and Sheikh Abdur Rahman Madani.

Attack in Bangladesh
On 14 April 2008, Hussain was assaulted by Bangladeshi airport officials at the Shahjalal International Airport in Dhaka. He was assisting an elderly woman with her daughter who had ticket problems, but entered a restricted part of the airport. He was then suspected of human trafficking by the officials, and was taken into a room, and beaten up for up to 55 minutes by the security officers. Later he was forced to sign a false statement, admitting to be involved with human trafficking. The effects of the attack included broken bones of his right leg and left arms, and bruises to most of his upper body, leaving him unable to walk.

An investigation was carried out of the incident, which resulted in the suspension and arrests of the officers involved in the attack, and there was much campaign against the attack by the Bangladeshi community in the UK, with media attention by Channel S. On 26 April 2008 demonstrations were held at Altab Ali Park near Brick Lane and Whitechapel, campaigned by the Bangladesh Human Rights Coalition, with petitions being signed online, demanding the trials of the officers, and apologies from the Caretaker government and the military.

References

External links

MGP News
Percival, Jenny. Leafler Bid For Reassurance. BBC News. 1 February 2007

1973 births
Living people
British Muslims
Bangladeshi emigrants to England
British people of Bangladeshi descent
Naturalised citizens of the United Kingdom
Hindi-language singers
British television presenters
British barristers
People from Habiganj District
People from East Ham
People from Loughborough
Alumni of the University of Derby
Alumni of Nottingham Trent University
Alumni of City, University of London
Alumni of the University of Huddersfield
20th-century Bengalis
21st-century Bengalis